The Swedish Dental Society is a Swedish odontological and dental organization.

It was founded on 21 November 1860, and got its current name in 1881. Originally a learned society, since December 1984 it has been a foundation with more emphasis on supporting dental research financially. It also provides for dental post-college education and arranges conferences.

The current chair is professor Per Vult von Steyern.

See also
Swedish Dental Association

References

Organizations established in 1860
Medical and health organizations based in Sweden
Dental organizations